Khandagayty (Xandagaytı) is a rural locality (a selo) and the administrative center of Ovyursky District of Tuva, Russia. Population:

References

Notes

Sources

Rural localities in Tuva